BLU-3 Pineapple was a cluster bomblet, 360 were deployed from the CBU-2A cluster bomb. It was used extensively in the Vietnam War by American forces. It was named "Pineapple" because of its appearance.  On some Arc Light missions, the B-52Ds carried two SUU-24 dispensers in the bomb bay, containing a total of 10,656 bomblets.

The BLU-3/B 'Pineapple' was a fragmentation bomblet for use against personnel and unarmored targets. After release from the aerial dispenser, the bomblet was stabilized by six pop-out drag vanes. It detonated on impact, and dispersed 250 high-velocity steel pellets.

Specifications
 Length: ; with vanes extended:
 Diameter: 
 Weight: 
 Warhead:  Cyclotol embedded with 200 steel pellets.

External links
 Designation systems.net list of US bomb systems

Cold War aerial bombs of the United States
Submunitions

{Spongebob}